Paris is a city in Edgar County, Illinois,  south of Chicago and  west of Indianapolis. The population was 8,291 at the 2020 census. It is the county seat and largest city of Edgar County.

History
Paris was established in 1826 on land donated by Samuel Vance to be the county seat, and was incorporated as a village in 1849. The town most likely received its name from the word "Paris" carved into a jack-oak tree in the middle of what became the town.

Paris's history includes the service of two brothers, Walter Booth and Newton Booth, as its mayors in the mid-1850s. Newton Booth later moved west to California, where he served as governor and a U.S. senator.

The commission form of government was adopted in 1915. In 1907, L. A. G. Shoaff bought the Centralia White Stockings and renamed them the Paris Colts. In 1908 the team was renamed the Paris Parisians. After the 1908 season the team went under. In the 1950s Paris was home to a minor-league baseball team named the Paris Lakers. A contest was held among the community to decide on a name for the team. James C. Dickey's submission, the Paris Lakers, was chosen. The Lakers were the 1956 Midwest League Champions and were affiliate of the Chicago Cubs.

Geography

U.S. Route 150 and Illinois State Route 1 pass through Paris. Both Illinois State Route 16 and Illinois State Route 133 have Illinois State Route 1 as their eastern terminus. One railroad passes through town, a CSX Transportation line that goes north to Danville and southeast to Terre Haute, Indiana.

Demographics
As of the 2020 census there were 8,291 people, 4,137 households, and 2,576 families residing in the city. The racial makeup of the city was 95.12% White, 0.54% African American, 0.24% Native American, 0.51% Asian, 0.81% from other races, and 2.79% from two or more races. Hispanic or Latino of any race were 1.81% of the population.

There were 4,137 households, out of which 34.47% had children under the age of 18 living with them, 43.00% were married couples living together, 14.48% had a female householder with no husband present, and 37.73% were non-families. 32.90% of all households were made up of individuals, and 15.69% had someone living alone who was 65 years of age or older. The average household size was 2.47 and the average family size was 2.03.

The city's age distribution consisted of 18.4% under the age of 18, 9.4% from 18 to 24, 24.3% from 25 to 44, 26.6% from 45 to 64, and 21.2% who were 65 years of age or older. The median age was 43.5 years. For every 100 females, there were 94.0 males. For every 100 females age 18 and over, there were 93.8 males.

The median income for a household in the city was $42,446, and the median income for a family was $49,612. Males had a median income of $38,295 versus $25,250 for females. The per capita income for the city was $24,984. About 12.1% of families and 14.1% of the population were below the poverty line, including 18.9% of those under age 18 and 8.2% of those age 65 or over.

Education
Paris has two public school districts: Paris Union School District 95 (for those living inside city limits) and Paris Community Unit School District No. 4 (for those outside the city limits). Those in District 95 send their children to Mayo Middle School, while Unit 4 children attend Crestwood School. Both schools feed into one high school, Paris High School, which until 2009 was under District 95. On July 1, 2009, the renamed Paris Cooperative High School became Illinois's first cooperative high school. The high school celebrated its 100-year anniversary in 2009.

Paris Cooperative High School's mascot is the tiger and its colors are orange and black.

Paris is also the home of Saint Mary's School, a Catholic school serving preschool through 8th grade open to children of all religions. St. Mary's is the only tuition-based private school in Paris.

Fire districts
The Paris Community Fire Protection District has five stations, including Paris, which is a full-time paid department. The others are Vermilion, Oliver, Grandview, and Redmon, which are all volunteer departments.

Climate
Climate is characterized by relatively high temperatures and evenly distributed precipitation throughout the year.  The Köppen Climate Classification subtype for this climate is "Cfa" (Humid Subtropical Climate).

Notable people

 Lionel Artis, civil servant 
 George W. Bristow, chief justice of the Illinois Supreme Court, lived in Paris
 Shorty Cantlon,  race car driver
 Ed Carpenter, race car driver, born in Paris
 Alfred M. Craig, chief justice of the Illinois Supreme Court, born in Paris
 Brett Eldredge, country music singer, born in Paris
 Jack Franklin, pitcher for the Brooklyn Dodgers
 Albert Austin Harding, University of Illinois band director, raised in Paris
 George Hunt, Illinois attorney general
 W. H. Lillard, college instructor, headmaster at Tabor Academy, head football coach at Dartmouth College
 Alice Moore McComas (1850–1919), author, editor, lecturer, and reformer
 Richard P. Mills, educator
 Jean Paige, actress
 Troy Porter, plumber and civil rights leader
 Bernie Shively, college football Hall of Fame member and University of Kentucky athletic director
 Benny Shoaff, American race car driver
 Lee Sholem, film and television director, born in Paris
 Abraham L. Stanfield, businessman and politician
 Barbara Stuart, actor, born in Paris
 Tom Sunkel, MLB pitcher, managed the Paris Lakers from 1950 to 1954
 Carl Switzer, actor
 Harold Switzer, actor, older brother of Carl Switzer
 Bill Van Dyke, outfielder for the Toledo Maumees, St. Louis Browns, and Boston Beaneaters
 Rodney Watson, men's head basketball coach, University of Southern Indiana
 William Zeckendorf, real estate developer

Sports teams
Paris Lakers, minor league baseball team from 1950 to 1959
Paris Parisians (Eastern Illinois League), semi-pro baseball team
Paris Picaduras, semi-pro baseball team

See also
Asher Morton Farmstead
Edgar County Courthouse
France Hotel
Paris Carnegie Public Library
Paris Elks Lodge No. 812 Building
Pine Grove Community Club

References

External links

Populated places established in 1826
Cities in Edgar County, Illinois
Cities in Illinois
County seats in Illinois
1826 establishments in Illinois